George Schneider (7 November 1844 - 2 January 1929) was a sergeant in the United States Army who was awarded the Presidential Medal of Honor for gallantry during the American Civil War. He was awarded the medal on 27 July 1896 for actions performed at the Battle of the Crater in Virginia on 30 July 1864.

Personal life 
Schneider was born in Baltimore, Maryland on 7 November 1844 to parents George W. Schneider and Christina Eidel Schneider. He was one of 5 children. He married Catherine F. Beck Schneider and fathered one child. He died in Baltimore on 2 January 1929 and was buried in Baltimore Cemetery in Baltimore.

Military service 
Schneider enlisted in the Army on 16 November 1861 as a private and was mustered into Company D of the 4th Maryland Infantry on the same day. However, his unit failed to recruit to full strength and was disbanded in May 1862. Schneider was transferred to Company H of the 3rd Maryland Infantry. He would eventually transfer to Company E of the same unit. At the Battle of the Crater near Petersburg, Virginia, he took the regimental colors from the color sergeant, who had been shot, and planted it on enemy fortifications during an infantry charge.

Schneider's Medal of Honor citation reads:

Schneider was mustered out of the Army on 31 July 1865 at Arlington Heights, Virginia.

References 

1844 births
1929 deaths
People from Baltimore
United States Army Medal of Honor recipients
American Civil War recipients of the Medal of Honor